The Mangu Line is a railway line connecting from Mangu to Kwangwoon University on the Gyeongwon Line, called the Mangu Line, which opened on December 30, 1963. Since November 4, 2013, the rapid transit service has been through this line executed.

See also
 Seoul Metropolitan Subway
 Rail transport in South Korea
 Jungang Line

References

 
Seoul Metropolitan Subway lines
Railway lines in South Korea
Railway lines opened in 1964